Humphrey Howe Leavitt (June 18, 1796 – March 15, 1873) was a United States representative from Ohio and a United States district judge of the United States District Court for the District of Ohio and the United States District Court for the Southern District of Ohio.

Education and career

Born on June 18, 1796, in Suffield, Connecticut, Leavitt moved with his family to the Northwest Territory in 1800, and settled in what would become Trumbull County, Ohio. He completed preparatory studies, attended an academy in western Pennsylvania, taught school and clerked in a store. He read law and was admitted to the bar in 1816. He served in the United States Army during the War of 1812. He entered private practice in Cadiz, Ohio from 1816 to 1820. He was a Justice of the peace in Harrison County, Ohio from 1818 to 1820. He was prosecutor of Monroe County, Ohio from 1818 to 1820. He resumed private practice in Steubenville, Ohio from 1820 to 1823. He was prosecutor for Jefferson County, Ohio from 1823 to 1829. He was a member of the Ohio House of Representatives from 1825 to 1826. He was a member of the Ohio Senate from 1827 to 1828. He was clerk of the Jefferson County Court of Common Pleas and Ohio Supreme Court from 1829 to 1832.

Congressional service

Leavitt was elected as a Jacksonian Democrat from Ohio's 11th congressional district and Ohio's 19th congressional district to the United States House of Representatives of the 21st United States Congress to fill the vacancy caused by the resignation of United States Representative John M. Goodenow. He was reelected to the 22nd and 23rd United States Congresses and served from December 6, 1830, until July 10, 1834, when he resigned to accept a judicial position.

Federal judicial service

Leavitt was nominated by President Andrew Jackson on June 28, 1834, to a seat on the United States District Court for the District of Ohio vacated by Judge Benjamin Tappan. He was confirmed by the United States Senate on June 28, 1834, and received his commission on June 30, 1834. Leavitt was reassigned by operation of law to the United States District Court for the Southern District of Ohio on February 10, 1855, to a new seat authorized by 10 Stat. 604. His service terminated on April 1, 1871, due to his retirement.

Notable case

Among the major cases in which Leavitt was involved was that of Ohio politician Clement Vallandigham, in which Leavitt wrote an opinion on Vallandigham's well-known habeas corpus case, which Leavitt decided.

Later activities and death

Leavitt moved to Cincinnati, Ohio, upon his reassignment to the Southern District of Ohio in 1855. He moved to Springfield, Ohio following his retirement in 1871. He engaged in literary pursuits after his retirement. He was a member of the World's Convention on Prison Reform in London, England in 1872. He died on March 15, 1873, in Springfield. He was interred in Spring Grove Cemetery in Cincinnati.

Family

Born to an old New England family involved in the purchase of the Western Reserve from the state of Connecticut, Leavitt parents were Captain John Wheeler Leavitt and Silence (Fitch) Leavitt. The town of Leavittsburg in Trumbull County was named for the family. Leavitt was married to Marie Antoinette (McDowell) Leavitt, daughter of Dr. John McDowell, a physician, Provost of the University of Pennsylvania and Governor of Pennsylvania. Humphey Howe and Marie Leavitt had three sons, including John McDowell Leavitt, all born at Steubenville.

Memoir

In a short memoir Leavitt wrote for his children, he described his feelings about a Congressman's job, which he described as "positively irksome and repulsive." Leavitt added: "In times of party division, it is impossible for anyone in Congress to preserve a conscience void of offense toward God and at the same time to bear true allegiance to the party by which he has been elected. The member must vote with his party irrespective of the public good or expect to be visited with the fiercest denunciation."

See also
 John Leavitt (Ohio settler)
 John McDowell Leavitt
 John Brooks Leavitt

References

Sources

Further reading
 The Ohio officer and justices' guide : embracing the duties of justices of the peace, constables, and other township officers : including officers acting under the school law, with appropriate forms : also, directions and forms for executors, administrators & guardians, with treatises on the law of partnership and bailment, and the duties and liabilities of common carriers, carriers of passengers, and innkeepers : with a collection of forms of deeds, articles of agreement, bonds, powers of attorney, wills, &c. &c., Humphrey H. Leavitt, Printed by J. Turnbull, Steubenville, Ohio, 1843

External links

 History of the Sixth Circuit, U.S. District Court, Humphrey Howe Leavitt, ca6.uscourts.gov
 Portrait of Humphrey Howe Leavitt, Potter Stewart United States Courthouse, Cincinnati, Ohio
 Autobiography of the Hon. Humprhey Howe Leavitt: Written for his family Humphrey Howe Leavitt, New York, 1893

1796 births
1873 deaths
Leavitt family
American Presbyterians
Members of the Ohio House of Representatives
Ohio state senators
Ohio state court judges
Judges of the United States District Court for the District of Ohio
Judges of the United States District Court for the Southern District of Ohio
United States federal judges appointed by Andrew Jackson
19th-century American judges
Politicians from Steubenville, Ohio
People from Cadiz, Ohio
Burials at Spring Grove Cemetery
People from Suffield, Connecticut
United States Army officers
United States Army personnel of the War of 1812
County district attorneys in Ohio
Jacksonian members of the United States House of Representatives from Ohio
19th-century American politicians
United States federal judges admitted to the practice of law by reading law